Youth is an album by American reggae singer Matisyahu, which was released on March 7, 2006. It is his second proper studio release, as Live at Stubb's is a live album. The CD quickly shot to the top of iTunes best sellers list the day it was released (partially because iTunes ran a special promotion for pre-orders).

The first single from the album is "King without a Crown", which also appeared on Matisyahu's previous album, Live at Stubb's. However, a different music video was shot for the Youth version of the song, whereas the version on the Stubb's concert album was accompanied by a concert video. The album debuted at number four on the Billboard 200 with over 119,000 copies sold in its first week released. A month later, the album was certified gold by the RIAA. As of September 24, 2008 the album has sold approximately 585,000 copies in the United States according to Nielsen Soundscan. On December 27, 2006, Billboard announced that Youth ranked 3rd overall on the 2006 Reggae album charts, immediately behind Live at Stubb's.

The topic of the album is mostly the support and promotion of youth voice, more explicitly in the eponymous second track. The album, along with its topic, mixes Matisyahu's lyrics, which contain several references to his Jewish beliefs, with a mainstream sound.

Track listing

Personnel
 Matisyahu – vocals
 Roots Tonic – music (Aaron Dugan: guitar, Josh Werner: bass and keys, Jonah David: drums)
 Marlon "Moshe" Sobol  – guest musician on "WP"
 Stan Ipcus – guest musician on "WP"
 Yusu Youssou – guest musician on "Shalom/Saalam" and "Ancient Lullaby"
 Bill Laswell – production, engineering
 Ill Factor & Jimmy Douglass – production on "Time of Your Song", "Indestructible", and "Jerusalem"
 Bob Musso – engineering
 James Dellatacoma – assistant engineering
 Michael Fossenkemper – mastering

Charts

References

Matisyahu albums
2006 albums
Epic Records albums
JDub Records albums